LS is an abbreviation for a family of Chinese built precision-guided munitions (PGM) named Thunder Stone Precision Guided Bomb (Léi-shí Jīngquè Zhì-dǎo Zhàdàn) developed by Luoyang Electro-Optics Technology Development Centre (EOTDC), a subsidiary of China Aerospace Science and Technology Corporation (CASC).  Alternatively, the LS PGB is also referred to by its gliding capability, as Thunder Stone Gliding Guided Bomb ( Léi-shí Huáxiáng Zhì-dǎo Zhàdàn), or LS GGB.  The guidance design of LS PGB is also adopted for another family of Chinese PGM, the YZ series, such as YZ-102 series.  These PGMs are referred to in China as precision guided bombs (PGB).

LS PGB
LS PGB is actually an upgrade kit to modernize gravity bombs with precision / laser guidance, with the kit consisted of two modules, the guidance module and the gliding module.  The guidance of the weapon is based on two other Chinese PGM, the FT PGB and LT PGB, with the former providing the inertial/satellite guidance, while the latter providing different types of laser guidance.  The gliding module including the folding wings and control surfaces is made of the composite material and aluminum alloys, and comes in different versions for different sizes of gravity bombs.  The LS PGB upgrade kit can be fit to iron bombs up to five tons.  Advanced versions are reportedly under development, such as imaging infrared targeting system, which is based on the seekers of air-to-air missiles developed by EOTDC.  When released at an altitude of eleven thousand meters, the maximum range of LS PGB is greater than sixty kilometers.

Chinese media have shown photographs of FT PGB being dropped from helicopters such as Chinese Naval Ka-28, in addition to the fixed-wing platforms.  However, for the laser guided subfamily of FT PGB based on LT PGB/LGB, neither nose-mounted nor mast-mounted targeting turrets have been specially developed for rotary platforms, but instead, the targeting pods for fixed-wing platforms are carried directly by Chinese helicopters for targeting.  All targeting pods developed for LT LGB/PGB can be used for the laser guided subfamily of FT PGB that is based on LT LGB/PGB, and additionally, general purpose targeting pod such as FILAT can also be used.  LS series GGB/PGB was first revealed to public at the 6th Zhuhai Airshow held in November 2006 with LT-6 model of the family.  All models in the family of this weapon are built to Chinese GJV289A standard, the Chinese equivalent of MIL-STD-1553B.  The adaptation of such military standard means that the weapon can be readily deployed on any western platforms.

Small 50 kg and 100 kg variants of the LS-6 are also featured, similar to the GBU-39 Small Diameter Bomb, that can be carried in the internal weapons bays of stealth fighters like the J-20.

CS/BBC5
At the 9th Zhuhai Airshow held in November 2012, another derivative of LS PGB developed by China South Industries Group was revealed to the public. Designated as CS/BBC5, this weaponry utilize the design of LS PGB but the shape of the bomb is different in that it has a cross section of square instead of a circle like the original LS PGB. Designed as a stand-off weapon and weighing at 500 kg, it carries sub-munitions and is a fire and forget weapon.

YZ-100 PGB
The guidance design of LS PGB is also adopted for another family of Chinese PGM, the YZ series, which made its public debut in the 8th Zhuhai Airshow held at the 3rd quarter of 2010, where the scale model of one member, YZ-102 of YZ-100 series was shown with pictorials of other members of YZ series.  YZ-100 series is divided into three subcategories by the weight of the bombs used: 30 kg, 50 kg, and 100 kg.  YZ-100 series is developed from its larger cousin YZ-200 series, and it is a scaled-down version of YZ-200 series.

Technically, YZ-100 series bombs are not PGBs, but cluster bombs instead.  What gives the precision guidance capability for YZ-100 series is in its sub-munitions: different guidance systems such as inertial, satellite, laser, infrared, and millimeter wave radar can be adopted for each sub-munition, depending on customer's request.  During deployments, once the YZ-100 series bombs is dropped over the general location of the targets, the sub-munitions are released, and this is the time when precision guidance actually begins, all the way until the final impact.  Although various guidance systems are available upon customer request, the cost is a major fact that prevents YZ-100 series to be purchased in huge quantity. As of the end of 2010, only six types of YZ-100 series PGB have been accepted into Chinese service due to budgetary constrains.  Another drawback of YZ-100 series PGB is that in comparison to dozens or hundred unguided sub-munitions each bomb carries, the number of sub-munitions each bomb carries is drastically reduced to as little as three when the sub-munition is guided, depending on the type of guidance adopted.

K/YBS500
YZ-100 PGB is considered by many as a weapon in the class of small diameter bomb, and its design has been adopted for larger weapon systems such as the K/YBS500 munitions dispenser / Air-to-surface missile. Developed by the 624th Factory of China North Industries Group Corporation, K/YBS500 system weigh 960 to 980 kg, and can be used as either a munition dispenser or an air-to-surface missile When used as a munition dispenser, the wings are removed and the system is attached to the fuselage of the aircraft, but can be discarded when needed. When used as a missile, the guidance can either be from the sub-munitions or dedicated seeker.

TL500
At the 9th Zhuhai Airshow held in November 2012, a scaled-down version of K/YBS500 utilizing the same YZ-100 design was shown to the public, and it was developed by the same company that developed K/YBS500.  Designated as TL500, with TL short for Tian Lei (or), meaning Sky Thunder, this system is around half the size of K/YBS500, weighing at 500 kg, hence the name TL500.  Like its bigger predecessor K/YBS500, TL500 can also be used as either a munition dispenser or air-to-surface missile.

YZ-200 PGB
The other member of YZ series PGBs are YZ-200 series PGB, which was also revealed at the 8th Zhuhai Airshow. In addition to YZ-200, one other member YZ-212 is also shown in photographic form. Despite of having larger serial numbers, YZ-200 was actually the first member of YZ series, and contrary to many frequent but erroneous claim, this weaponry is not a Chinese copy of similar Soviet/Russian sample, but instead, YZ-200 traces its root back to the American CBU-100 cluster bomb. Unexploded examples of CBU-100 bombs in Vietnam War were provided to China by North Vietnam, and reverse engineering efforts resulted in the Chinese Type 250 series cluster bomb fielded in 1979, and YZ-200 is a direct descendant of the Type 250-series cluster bomb.

Like its smaller cousin YZ-100 series, YZ-200 is also divided into three subcategories by the weight of the bombs used, except it's larger: 50 kg, 125 kg, and 250 kg.  The primary differences between YZ-100 series & YZ-200 series is that YZ-200 series is a truly PGB because the guidance system is installed on the bomb, so precision guidance is not achieved via sub-munitions. All guidance systems used for YZ-100 series can also be utilized for YZ-200 series, which inherits the same drawback - cost, which has limited the total types of YZ-200 series adopted by Chinese armed forces to nine (as end of 2010), despite that more types are available based on the guidance systems utilized.

CM-506KG
At the 9th Zhuhai Airshow held in November 2012, another series of gliding bomb developed from LS PGB was revealed to the public. Designated as CM-506 kg, it weighs 150 kg and has a maximum range of 130 km.  Guidance is inertial navigation and satellite guidance, but other forms of guidance can be adopted, such as TV, IR, mm wave radar, and SAL.

Operator
: People's Liberation Army
People's Liberation Army Air Force
People's Liberation Army Navy Air Force
: Serbian Air Force
: Pakistan Air Force

References

Weapons of the People's Republic of China
Guided bombs
Military equipment introduced in the 2000s